Adrian Davis (born December 17, 1981) is a former Canadian football defensive tackle who played four seasons in the Canadian Football League. He was drafted in the fourth round of the 2006 CFL Draft by the Montreal Alouettes. He played CIS football for the Concordia Stingers and before that, played for the Vanier College Cheetahs.

Davis also played for the Toronto Argonauts.

On May 19, 2011 Davis was traded to the Calgary Stampeders, along with wide receiver Reggie McNeal, for wide receiver P.K. Sam and defensive lineman Miguel Robede.

References

External links
Toronto Argonauts bio
Just Sports Stats

1981 births
Living people
Calgary Stampeders players
Canadian football defensive linemen
Concordia Stingers football players
Montreal Alouettes players
Sportspeople from Longueuil
Players of Canadian football from Quebec
Toronto Argonauts players